Chandrashekhar Yadav is an Indian politician. He is a Minister of Education in Government of Bihar & member of Bihar Legislative Assembly from Madhepura. He is a member of Bihar Legislative Assembly since 2010.

References

Bihar MLAs 2010–2015
Bihar MLAs 2015–2020
Bihar MLAs 2020–2025
Living people
Rashtriya Janata Dal politicians